The lateral sacral veins accompany the lateral sacral arteries on the anterior surface of the sacrum. They drain into the internal iliac vein. They communicate with each other via the sacral venous plexus.

Additional images

References

Veins of the torso